The 1973–74 Kentucky Wildcats men's basketball team represented the University of Kentucky during the 1973–74 college basketball season. This team would finish with the worst record of any Kentucky team coached by Joe B. Hall.

Schedule

References

Kentucky Wildcats men's basketball seasons
Kentucky
Kentucky Wildcats
Kentucky Wildcats